Si Inthrathit (also spelt ) was the first king of the Sukhothai Kingdom, a historical kingdom of Thailand, and ruled from 1238 until around 1270. He is credited as the founder of the Phra Ruang (พระร่วง) Dynasty, itself credited as the first historical Siamese dynasty, having a double claim to this title: for being cradled precisely in the region designated by foreigners as "Siam", and for being the dynasty which freed the Thai principalities from the Cambodian yoke.

Difficulties in interpretation 
Initially known as Pho Khun Bang Klang Hao, interpreted as ”the lord who rules the sky”, the controversy surrounding this names illustrates the limitations of epigraphy. This science studies inscriptions or epigraphs as writing, to identify graphemes, clarify their meanings, and classify their uses according to dates and cultural contexts. Texts inscribed on steles are often missing the top or bottom portions, just where one would expect dates, complicating the drawing of conclusions about the writing and the writers. Specifically excluded from epigraphy are the historical significance of an epigraph as a document, and the artistic value of a literary composition. These complications led to the ruler in his early life being known as simply Hao (หาว).

Life
Prior to his reign, Bang Klang Hao was the chief of Bang Yang, a territory which belonged to the westernmost regions of the Khmer Empire at that time. The territory now lies in the north-central region of Thailand.

Bang Klang Hao, together with Khun Pha Mueang of Mueang Rat, decided to rebel and declare independence from Angkor. Khmer control and its prohibitive taxes were crucial motivations for the rebellion. Extensive Khmer preoccupation with great architectural works weakened the ability and readiness of Khmer defenses, indirectly aiding the rebellion. Bang Klang Hao captured Si Satchanalai and gave it to Pha Mueang. Pha Mueang reciprocated by giving him Sukhothai.

Pho Khun Bang Klang Hao was then declared king at Sukhothai, taking a regnal name of Sanskrit origin, Si Inthrathit, translated from "Adityan Indra". His skill and bravery greatly impressed the people of the kingdom, who thus conferred him the title Phra Ruang (”glorious prince”). This title was given to all subsequent rulers of Sukhothai, thus giving rise to the first Thai royal dynasty of Phra Ruang.

Si Inthrathit and his queen, Sueang, had three sons. The eldest died at a young age, and the second was named Ban Mueang. His third son defeated a Khmer prince on elephants in mounted combat; he named this youngest son Ram Khamhaeng (”Rama the Bold“) in tribute to the feat. Si Inthrathit died around 1270, and was succeeded by his son Ban Mueang.

References

Further reading 

1270 deaths
Kings of Sukhothai
Tai history
Year of birth unknown
13th-century monarchs in Asia
13th-century Thai people
12th-century Thai people
Founding monarchs